"Can't Stop the Feeling!" is a song recorded by American singer Justin Timberlake. It was released on May 6, 2016, as the lead single of the soundtrack to the film Trolls (2016), in which Timberlake voiced the character "Branch" and served as the executive music producer. It was written and produced by Timberlake, Max Martin, and Shellback. Musically, "Can't Stop the Feeling!" is an uptempo disco-pop, soul-pop number with funk influences.

The song was released as a single on May 6, 2016, six months before the film debuted, and serviced to contemporary hit radio on May 10, 2016. Timberlake gave his first televised performance of "Can't Stop the Feeling!" during the interval act of the Eurovision Song Contest 2016 grand final. It was followed by a music video directed by Mark Romanek, which was released on May 16, 2016. The music video follows Timberlake on a tour to everyday places as he dances through what a typical day may be. , it accumulated over 1.6 billion views. A wide number of fan-made videos followed the song's video release.

The single debuted atop the US Billboard Hot 100, opening with 379,000 downloads in its first week, marking Timberlake's fifth number-one single in the country, and making it the twenty-sixth song in the Hot 100 history to start at the summit of the chart. Additionally, it became the second song to spend its first ten weeks atop the Digital Songs chart. The single marked his fifth number-one single on the Radio Songs chart and his eighth on the Mainstream Top 40; it is among the top twenty longest-leading number-one singles on the Adult Contemporary chart. Internationally, it topped the charts in Argentina, Brazil, Belgium, Canada, the Czech Republic, France, Germany, Hungary, Israel, Mexico, the Netherlands, Russia, Scotland, Slovakia, Slovenia, South Africa, Sweden, and Switzerland, and the top five in most of Europe.

"Can't Stop the Feeling!" was the best-selling song of 2016 in the US. , it has sold 3.3 million downloads in the country. For Apple Music it was the second-best-performing song of the year. The Official Charts Company from the UK named it Timberlake's biggest song in the country, for over one million units sold. The song received several awards and nominations, such as its nominations for the Academy Award for Best Original Song at the 89th annual ceremony (where Timberlake performed the song as the opening number), the Golden Globe Award for Best Original Song and the Critics' Choice Award for Best Song, and it won the Grammy Award for Best Song Written for Visual Media. This is the 41st Hot 100 number one song to be nominated for an Academy Award.

Background and composition 

In the early stages of recording his fifth studio album, Timberlake also served as the executive music producer for the soundtrack to the film Trolls. The uptempo disco-pop track was written and produced by Timberlake, Max Martin and Shellback. Entertainment Weekly described the song as a "funky mix of disco and pop." For The A.V. Club it is "a soul-pop sugar rush tweaked for maximum dance grooves." "Can't Stop the Feeling!" is written in the key of C major with a tempo of 113 beats per minute. The song follows a chord progression of CAm7Fmaj9Am7, and Timberlake's vocals span two octaves, from E3 to E5. The track features a "jazzy", uptempo beat and a falsetto chorus.

"This movie feels like one big, trippy disco experience. But we didn't have a disco song," said Timberlake of the Trolls soundtrack. "We had 'September' [by Earth, Wind & Fire], but we thought this was a great opportunity to do a modern disco song. I think that disco is a really underappreciated genre." "Can't Stop the Feeling!" appears in the denouement of the movie, conceived with the idea of covering the disco genre inspired by the situation of the final scene. Timberlake commented the song was inspired by Bill Withers' "Lovely Day".

Critical reception 
The song received generally positive reviews from music critics. Writers from Billboard, Rolling Stone, Fuse and USA Today highlighted its attractiveness for the summer season. Adelle Platon from Billboard called it "delightful" and a "feel-good jam". Nate Chinen from The New York Times wrote "Timberlake is on firm footing here, gliding over a disco-pop beat and urging all comers to catch the spirit." Jon Niles from Music Times wrote: "The song gives off a feeling of pure joy that only a talent as great as Timberlake could bring to the table." For Lisa Respers France of CNN Entertainment, "If Friday had a sound, it would be Justin Timberlake's "Can't Stop the Feeling!"." Ed Masley wrote in AZCentral "the lyrics sound like they were custom-made to be the soundtrack to your favorite summer memories." For The A.V. Club, Annie Zaleski wrote "a perfect summer song is one I can blast while driving in the car with the windows down. The tune doesn't have to be meaningful—in fact, the more lightweight, the better—and it should offer a few minutes of unadulterated escapism. This year, I can already tell that "Can't Stop The Feeling!" is my hot-weather jam."

The A.V. Club included it among the 40 best songs of 2016 (first half). Billboard critics ranked "Can't Stop the Feeling!" at number 33 on their "100 Best Pop Songs of 2016" list, adding "the rhythm is eventually gonna get you to dance." Digital Spy considered it the 19th-best pop song of the year, while Idolator named it the 20th-best song of the year, for "feel-good" and "infectious." Aversely, contributors for Time and Spin gave it unfavorable reviews, with the former naming it the worst song of 2016 and the latter stating, "There are certain songs notable not only for their popularity, but for an insufferable repetition."

Accolades
"Can't Stop the Feeling!" won the Grammy Award for Best Song Written for Visual Media at the 59th Annual Grammy Awards. Timberlake received the Hollywood Song Award for "Can't Stop the Feeling!" at the 2016 Hollywood Film Awards and won the award for Best Song Written for an Animated Film at the 2016 Hollywood Music in Media Awards. It was nominated for the Academy Award for Best Original Song, Golden Globe Award for Best Original Song, Critics' Choice Award for Best Song, Satellite Award for Best Original Song, and by the Guild of Music Supervisors Awards for Best Song/Recording Created for a Film.

"Can't Stop the Feeling!" won the award for Song of the Year at the 2017 iHeartRadio Music Awards and Favorite Song at the 43rd People's Choice Awards. At the former it was also nominated for Best Song from a Movie. For the 2016 Teen Choice Awards, it received nominations for Choice Summer Song, Choice Party Song and Choice Song from a Movie or TV Show. It received nominations for Song of the Summer at the 2016 MTV Video Music Awards, for International Song of the Year at the 2016 NRJ Music Awards, and for Favorite Song at the 2017 Kids' Choice Awards. The 2016 BBC Music Awards shortlisted it for Song of the Year nominee. Among other international awards, it was nominated at the Australian APRA Music Awards in the category International Work of the Year, at the Hungarian Music Awards in Modern Pop-Rock Album/Record of the Year, and at the Mexican Telehit Awards in Song of the Year. "Can't Stop The Feeling!" was also nominated for the 2017 Radio Disney Music Awards in the categories Song of the Year and Song to Dance to, and at the 2017 MTV Movie & TV Awards for Best Musical Moment.

At the 2017 Billboard Music Awards it won the awards for Top Selling Song and Top Radio Song, and was also nominated for Top Hot 100 Song. The American Society of Composers, Authors and Publishers (ASCAP) recognized it as one of the most performed songs of 2016 and 2017. It is also nominated for World Soundtrack Award for Best Original Song Written Directly for a Film.

Grammy category

Instead of Timberlake's solo version, the film version of the song was submitted to the general field and visual media category, eventually getting nominated only in the latter and winning. The Recording Academy changed some rules for the next awards. Grammy SVP Bill Freimuth explained to Variety:

Commercial performance

North America
Counting its first three days of airplay, "Can't Stop the Feeling!" debuted at number 24 on the US Mainstream Top 40 and started at a personal-best number 19 on Adult Top 40, both for the charts dated May 21, 2016. "Can't Stop the Feeling!" became the first song in the history of Mediabase Top 40 to close the entire Top 40 radio station panel in the first week, being the "most added" song in all 186 of them.

"Can't Stop the Feeling!" became the 26th song to debut at number one on the US Billboard Hot 100 on the chart issue dated May 28, 2016, marking Justin Timberlake's fifth chart-topping single in the country. The song started at the Hot 100's summit powered most heavily by its number-one debut on the Digital Songs sales chart (where it was Timberlake's sixth leader), having sold 379,000 downloads in its first week (ending May 12), according to Nielsen Music. Timberlake scored his highest weekly sales total for a song, besting the 315,000-unit start for "Suit & Tie" in 2013. It entered Streaming Songs at number six with 15.6 million US streams in its first full week. On Radio Songs, it ascended from 27-9 following its first full week of airplay (83 million in audience), becoming the first song to reach the Radio Songs top 10 in just two chart weeks since Adele's "Hello" (November 14, 2015). With "Give It to Me" having last led the Hot 100 dated April 28, 2007, Timberlake returned to number one after nine years and one month, the longest span between leaders since Christina Aguilera waited 10 years, two months and one week between "Lady Marmalade" in 2001 and her featured turn on Maroon 5's "Moves like Jagger" in 2011. Among males, it saw Timberlake end the longest break between Hot 100 number ones since Dr. Dre went 12 years, two months and three weeks between "No Diggity" (by Blackstreet featuring Dr. Dre) and "Crack a Bottle", his collaboration with Eminem and 50 Cent. The song spent 52 weeks on the Billboard Hot 100, becoming one of a few singles to have spent at least a year on the chart, and 62 weeks on the Digital Songs chart.

"Can't Stop the Feeling!" reached number one on Radio Songs in just its fifth week, marking the quickest sprint to the top since Adele's "Hello" needed just four weeks in November 2015. Among male artists, the single made the fastest rise to number one on Radio Songs in nearly 25 years, since Michael Jackson's "Black or White" set the record with a three-week climb in 1991. Mariah Carey's "I'll Be There" tied the mark in 1992. The single also tied Adele's "Hello" for the fastest-ever rise to the top of the Adult Top 40. Among males, "Feeling" bested Pharrell Williams' eight-week trip to the top with "Happy", which reached number one in April 2014, for the quickest climb to the top spot by a solo male artist. "Can't Stop the Feeling!" also reached the top of the Mainstream Top 40, where Timberlake passed Bruno Mars for the most number ones among males.

With "Can't Stop the Feeling!" spending a sixth week atop Digital Songs, it became Timberlake's longest lead atop the chart, passing "SexyBack". Additionally, it marked Timberlake's best weekly audience for a song with 163 million, passing the 159 million that "Mirrors" drew at its peak. The following week, it became Timberlake's first solo number one on Adult Contemporary. Reaching the AC summit in just its eighth week, "Feeling" completed the fastest run to number one for a (non-holiday) song by a male artist in 17 years, since Phil Collins' "You'll Be in My Heart" needed only six weeks in 1999. Among all songs, "Feeling" made the fastest trip to number one on AC since Adele's "Hello": four weeks, in November 2015. Timberlake also earned his sixth number-one on Dance Club Songs with "Can't Stop the Feeling!". He reached the top of the chart without the aid of officially commissioned remixes. However, versions from Barry Harris, Fenix and Erick Decks, among others, have helped bring the song to club crowds. "Can't Stop the Feeling!" became the eighth song to top Digital Songs for at least 10 weeks and the first since Mark Ronson's "Uptown Funk" led for a record-tying 13 weeks in 2015; Flo Rida's "Low" first set the mark with 13 weeks at number one on Digital Songs in 2007–08. "Feeling" is the second song to spend its first 10 weeks on Digital Songs at number one, joining The Black Eyed Peas' "Boom Boom Pow", which logged its first 10 weeks on the chart at the summit in 2009.

In the US it was the best-selling song of the summer, while being listed at 2 on the Billboard seasonal ranking. Spotify named it the fifth most-streamed song of the summer globally. , it has sold 2.495 million downloads in the country, thus being the best-selling song of the year according to Nielsen Music. It was also the number three most-heard song on US radio in 2016, with 3.422 billion audience impressions for the year. It was the number two most-played song in terms of total number of plays, with 587,000.

"Can't Stop the Feeling!" is among the top 20 longest-leading number-one singles on the Adult Contemporary chart. It is also one of only eight singles in the Billboard Hot 100's 58-year history to spend its first 40 weeks or more in the top 40.

It reached the top position of the Canadian Hot 100 in its fifth week, after spending its first four weeks at number 2.

By September 2016, it has been certified quadruple platinum by the Recording Industry Association of America (RIAA) and sextuple platinum by Music Canada. , the song has accumulated 7.6 million units in the US, combining sales (3.3 million downloads) and equivalent streams.

In 2016, "Can't Stop the Feeling!" was ranked as the 9th most popular song of the year on the Billboard Hot 100.

One year after its release, "Can't Stop the Feeling!" finished as the 49th most popular song of the year on the Billboard Hot 100 in 2017.

Europe and Oceania
"Can't Stop the Feeling!" reached the top spot in Belgium (Flanders and Wallonia), the Czech Republic, France, Germany, Israel, Scotland, Slovakia, Slovenia, Sweden, Switzerland, and the top 5 in Australia, Austria, Denmark, Greece, Hungary, Ireland, Latvia, Lebanon, the Netherlands, New Zealand, Norway, Poland, Portugal, Russia, Spain, and the United Kingdom. It spent four weeks atop the Euro Digital Songs chart.

The song debuted at number three on the UK Singles Chart, and remained in the number 2 position for four weeks, it later reached the top spot of the UK Singles Sales Chart and spent two weeks as well at the top position. The Official Charts Company from the UK named it Timberlake's biggest song in the country with over 1 million units sold, surpassing 2013's "Mirrors". It was ranked 10 on UK year-end chart, while being the 3rd-best-selling song of the year in the territory. According to Phonographic Performance Limited, it was the most played song on UK radio, TV and in public places during 2016, while Timberlake was placed fifth.

By September 2022, it has been certified diamond by the Bundesverband Musikindustrie, Syndicat National de l'Édition Phonographique and the Polish Society of the Phonographic Industry (ZVAP), elevenfold platinum by the Australian Recording Industry Association (ARIA), septuple platinum by the Swedish Recording Industry Association (GLF), quintuple platinum by the Federazione Industria Musicale Italiana (FIMI), quatruple platinum by the Belgian Entertainment Association (BEA), and triple platinum by the British Phonographic Industry (BPI), and Denmark's IFPI, and double platinum by the Recorded Music New Zealand (RMNZ).

Music video 
The first video released, titled "First Listen", features cast members from the DreamWorks Animation's Trolls, among them such as Anna Kendrick, Gwen Stefani, James Corden, Zooey Deschanel, Ron Funches, Caroline Hjelt, Aino Jawo, Christopher Mintz-Plasse, and Kunal Nayyar. 

The song's official music video was released on May 16, 2016. Helmed by director Mark Romanek, the "Can't Stop the Feeling!" video follows Timberlake on a tour to everyday places like a laundromat, diner, barbershop and a donut shop, with an individual dancing along to the single at every stop. All the revelers eventually end up congregating with Timberlake below a highway underpass where they dance together to the song. As described by Time editor Cady Lang, Timberlake "dances through what a typical day might be: breakfast at the diner and grocery shopping." Talking to Entertainment Weekly, director Mark Romanek described the concept as "just the overall feeling of unironic and sincere humanism. It's not trying to be cool or slick or ironic. It's just fun. Most of the time, people are excellent. It's just a big sugar cookie. It makes people smile for four minutes." He stated the brief dance-off between Timberlake and an inflatable arm waving tube man was inspired by Gene Kelly dancing with Jerry the mouse in Anchors Aweigh. Bustle writer Amy Mackelden highlighted the scene as the best moment of the video. Esquire editor Jonathan Evans addressed Timberlake's monochromatic outfit, writing "the singer nails it by playing with shades of the color [white], plus throwing some pattern and texture in the mix."

The video received nominations for Best Male Video International at the 2016 MTV Video Music Awards Japan, for Best Music Video at the 2017 iHeartRadio Music Awards, and for Favorite Music Video at the 2017 Nickelodeon Kids' Choice Awards.

By November 2022 the YouTube music video had received more than 1.6 billion views.

Live performances 
On May 9, 2016, it was announced Timberlake would perform his song during the interval act of the Eurovision Song Contest 2016 finale, which took place in Stockholm, Sweden on May 14, 2016. This was the first time in the contest's history whereby a celebrated artist who had never participated in the contest performed. Timberlake opened the performance singing "Rock Your Body", soon switching over to "Can't Stop the Feeling!". He was joined by a group of backup singers/dancers and a horn section for the song's televised debut. The performance wasn't aired in the US due to rights issues. The day before the main show, Timberlake made his first appearance before an audience on night rehearsal to perform both songs.

On February 26, 2017, Timberlake opened the 89th Academy Awards with a performance of "Can't Stop the Feeling!", which included an R&B breakdown and a cover of Bill Withers' "Lovely Day" at the end. Timberlake began the performance in the front corridor of the Dolby Theatre, dancing his way to the stage with his backup dancers. The song was also the closing number of his Super Bowl LII halftime show performance.

Usage in other media 
In June 2016, Billboard named it the wedding DJs' fourth most popular party song in the US. Numerous fan-made videos followed the video's release, which includes The Memphis Grizzlies, the United States Olympic Committee, citizens of Memphis, Gilbert, graduates of the University of Wisconsin–Milwaukee, among others. On May 26, 2016, Victoria's Secret Angels released a video in which they lip-synced to the song.

Choreographers Celia Rowlson-Hall and Crishon Landers with the help of film producer Mia Lidofsky created a flash mob dance video on October 2, 2016, in support of the Hillary Clinton presidential campaign, 2016 set to the music of "Can't Stop the Feeling!" — with all of the dancers wearing pantsuits in reference to Hillary Clinton's outfit of choice. They called the event #Pantsuitpower Flashmob for Hillary. The video was covered in news media including The Washington Post, The Guardian, and Vogue, — and garnered over 2 million views on Facebook. From New York City, the Pantsuit Power movement then spread to Raleigh, North Carolina on October 23, 2016, with another flash mob. The song was also used for an opening video for the 2017 Western Conservative Summit, featuring Republican politicians from Colorado.

The song was also featured in an episode of the American Broadcasting Company series Speechless called "P-R-PROM".

Other versions and covers

The film version featured in the soundtrack album includes additional vocals from Anna Kendrick, James Corden, Zooey Deschanel and Gwen Stefani.

In June 2016, American country music group Lady A covered the song in a live performance in Columbus, Ohio. Jon Freeman of Rolling Stone commented it "evoked the loose spirit of a jam band unwinding at a summer festival." Country performer Hunter Hayes covered the song when he headlined The Paramount in Huntington, New York in June 2017. An editor from Digital Journal opined it was "in a clever fashion, which was great deal of fun, both for him and the audience."

Credits and personnel

Locations 

Engineered at MXM Studios and Conway Recording Studios in Los Angeles, California and MXM Studios in Stockholm, Sweden
Recorded (horns) at Studio Willow-Valley in Gothenburg, Sweden
Mixed at MixStar Studios in Virginia Beach, Virginia
Mastered at Sterling Sound Studios in New York City

Personnel 

 Justin Timberlake – lead vocals, writing, production, percussion
 Max Martin – writing, production, background vocals, keyboards, programming, 
 Shellback – writing, production, drums, bass, background vocals, keyboards, programming, percussion, 
 Elliot Ives – guitars
 Wojtek Goral – saxophone, horns arrangement
 Janne Bjerger – trumpet
 Peter "Noos" Johanson – trombone
 Mattias Bylund – horns, horns arrangement, horns recording and editing
 Noah "Mailbox" Passovoy – engineering
 Samuel Holland – engineering
 Serban Ghenea – mixing
 John Hanes – engineering for mix
 Tom Coyne – mastering

Credits adapted from the liner notes of the CD single of "Can't Stop the Feeling" (RCA Records).

Charts

Weekly charts

Year-end charts

Decade-end charts

All-time charts

Certifications

Release history

See also
 List of artists with the most number ones on the Billboard Mainstream Top 40 chart
 List of best-selling singles
 List of best-selling singles in Australia
 List of Billboard Hot 100 number-one singles of 2016
 List of Canadian Hot 100 number-one singles of 2016
 List of number-one hits of 2016 (France)
 List of number-one hits of 2016 (Germany)
 List of number-one hits of 2016 (Switzerland)
 List of number-one singles and albums in Sweden
 List of number-one songs of 2016 (Mexico)
 List of number-one singles of 2016 (South Africa)
 List of number-one dance singles of 2016 (U.S.)
 List of number-one adult contemporary singles of 2016 (U.S.)
 List of Ultratop 50 number-one singles of 2016
 List of airplay number-one hits of the 2010s (Argentina)

References

External links 
 

2016 singles
2016 songs
Trolls (franchise)
Billboard Hot 100 number-one singles
Canadian Hot 100 number-one singles
Dutch Top 40 number-one singles
Gwen Stefani songs
Justin Timberlake songs
Monitor Latino Top General number-one singles
Music videos directed by Mark Romanek
SNEP Top Singles number-one singles
Number-one singles in Germany
Number-one singles in Iceland
Number-one singles in Israel
Number-one singles in Russia
Number-one singles in Scotland
Number-one singles in Sweden
Number-one singles in Switzerland
Song recordings produced by Justin Timberlake
Song recordings produced by Max Martin
Song recordings produced by Shellback (record producer)
Songs about dancing
Songs written by Justin Timberlake
Songs written by Max Martin
Ultratop 50 Singles (Flanders) number-one singles
South African Airplay Chart number-one singles
Grammy Award for Best Song Written for Visual Media
Songs written for animated films
American disco songs
RCA Records singles
Viral videos